Mirish may refer to:
 Mirisch, a surname
 Miri, people of a town 
 Mirish, Iran, a village